The Association of former deportees and political detainees is a non-governmental organisation in Moldova.

Valentina Sturza is the chair of the Association of former deportees and political detainees.

External links 
 Asociaţia Foştilor Deportaţi şi Deţinuţi Politici
 Asociaţia Foştilor Deportaţi şi Deţinuţi Politici
 Valentina Sturza

References 

Political organizations based in Moldova